Robert Findlay (29 March 1877 – 13 August 1926) was a Scottish footballer who played as an outside left for Kilmarnock (two spells), Celtic, Dundee, Motherwell, Hamilton Academical, Port Glasgow Athletic, St Bernard's (on loan) and Scotland.

During his first spell at Kilmarnock, he won the Scottish Football League Division Two title twice, played in the 1898 Scottish Cup Final (a defeat at the hands of Rangers) and gained his sole international cap in the same year. With Port Glasgow, he was a Renfrewshire Cup winner in 1909 (scoring the winning goal in the final). His 'big move' to Celtic was disrupted by injury, and this also affected other spells including a return to Kilmarnock.

Findlay emigrated to New Jersey with his family around 1914; his son William represented the United States men's national soccer team at the Olympic Games in 1924 and 1928. His younger brother Tom was also a footballer, and a teammate of Robert at Kilmarnock, Motherwell and Port Glasgow Athletic.

References

Sources

External links

Scotland profile, London Hearts Supporters Club 

1877 births
1926 deaths
Scottish footballers
Scotland international footballers
Association football outside forwards
Scottish emigrants to the United States
Scottish Football League players
Scottish Junior Football Association players 
Kilmarnock F.C. players
Celtic F.C. players
Motherwell F.C. players
Dundee F.C. players
Hamilton Academical F.C. players
St Bernard's F.C. players
Port Glasgow Athletic F.C. players
Footballers from East Ayrshire